Adventurers Club was a quarterly magazine published by Hero Games and edited at various times by Steve Peterson, Bill Robinson and Bruce Harlick. It was started in 1983 and ceased publication in 1995. In total 27 issues were published.

Contents
Adventurers Club originally featured supplementary material for Champions and Espionage, as well as news from Hero Games and a letter column purportedly edited by the fictional villain Foxbat.

History
In 1983, Hero Games kicked off its house magazine: Adventurers Club. However, by 1986, the company was having problems with cash flow and manpower, and as a result Adventurers Club #7 (Summer 1986), which had been prepared in March 1985, was delayed for over a year while money was diverted toward other projects. 

As the result of a merger in 1988 between Hero Games and Iron Crown Enterprises (ICE), five issues of the magazine (#8 to #12) featured articles about both Hero and ICE games. In the 2014 book Designers & Dragons, game historian Shannon Appelcline wrote, "Unfortunately, fans hated the split magazine. In their final dual-branded issue, editor Aaron Allston acknowledged that half of the readers had been asking that the ICE articles be removed and the other half had been asking that only ICE articles be covered."

In response, Adventurers Club was once again dedicated solely to Hero games, while ICE published a tabloid magazine, Iron Crown Quarterly, which focussed only on ICE games such as Rolemaster, Spacemaster, and Middle-earth Role Playing; ICE produced seven issues of Iron Crown Quartertly from 1988–1990.

Reception
Allen Varney reviewed the magazine twice in the pages of Dragon:
 In the October 1990 edition (Issue 162), Varney derided Adventurers Clubs claim of being a quarterly publication, pointing out that it had "appeared more or less annually for years." Varney commented that although it "deserves attention for its scenarios, NPCs, gadgets and campaigning tips", it was "thin and badly printed. At $3 an issue, it's still in a wait-and-see stage."  
 In the September 1993 edition (Issue 197), Varney again noted that the magazine had rarely appeared on time in its first decade of publication. Varney thought that even in the latest issues, "Style and grammar still fall short of professional standards, and four bucks an issue seems a steep price on that count, if nothing else." He also noted that each individual issue might have little material for a gamemaster because "its coverage of all the different Hero System game genres means that any one issue may offer little for your own campaign."   

In the Nov-Dec 1983 edition of Space Gamer (Issue No. 66), Russell Grant Collins thought that the magazine featured material essential for players of Champions, saying, "If you GM a Champions campaign, I really recommend this magazine. If you GM Espionage!, then it still might appeal to you. It is a worthy addition to the Hero line."

References

Defunct magazines published in the United States
Magazines established in 1983
Magazines disestablished in 1995
Quarterly magazines published in the United States
Role-playing game magazines